Orchard Boulevard MRT station is an underground Mass Rapid Transit station on the Thomson–East Coast Line (TEL). Situated in Orchard, Singapore, the station is at the end of Orchard Boulevard with Grange Road. Surrounding developments include Camden Medical Centre, Tanglin Mall, JEN by Shangri-La Hotel and various embassies.

First announced in August 2012 as part of the Thomson line (TSL), the station was constructed as part of TEL Phase 3 (TEL 3) with the merger of the TSL and the Eastern Region line. The station opened on 13 November 2022. An Art-in-Transit artwork PULSE by Twardzik Ching Chor Leng is displayed at this station.

History

The station was first announced on 29 August 2012 as part of the Thomson line (TSL). Contract T218 for the design and construction of Orchard Boulevard Station was awarded to KTC Civil Engineering & Construction Pte Ltd at S$143 million (US$ million) in May 2014. Construction started in 2014, with an initial expected completion date of 2021.

On 15 August 2014, the Land Transport Authority (LTA) announced that the TSL would merge with the Eastern Region line to form the Thomson–East Coast line (TEL). Orchard Boulevard station, part of the proposed line, would be constructed as part of TEL 3, consisting of 13 stations between Mount Pleasant and Gardens by the Bay. With restrictions imposed on construction due to the COVID-19 pandemic, the TEL3 completion date was pushed by one year to 2022.

On 9 March 2022, Transport Minister S Iswaran announced in Parliament that TEL 3 would open in the second half of that year.

Description 
Orchard Boulevard station serves the TEL and is between the Napier and Orchard stations. The official station code is TE13. Being part of the TEL, the station is operated by SMRT Trains. Train frequencies on the TEL range from 5 to 6 minutes.

The station is located along Orchard Boulevard at the junction with Grange Road and Rochalie Drive. Surrounding landmarks of the station include: Camden Medical Centre, the Chinese embassy, the US embassy, Jen Singapore Tanglin by Shangri-La, Orchard Rendezvous Hotel, Tanglin Shopping Centre and Tudor Court Shopping Gallery.

PULSE by Twardzik Ching Chor Leng is a network of industrial-scale pipes that hang over the station concourse. The work is intended to depict the constant circulation of people on the MRT system and its importance in keeping the city alive, paralleling the functions of the human circulatory system that maintains the flow of nutrients.

References

External links
 

Mass Rapid Transit (Singapore) stations
Railway stations in Singapore opened in 2022